Mohamad Aly "Mo" Elleithee (born December 13, 1972) is an American political campaign strategist. A Democrat, he has served as spokesman for the Democratic National Committee, Hillary Clinton, and other Democratic elected officials and organizations. He is currently executive director of the Institute of Politics and Public Service at Georgetown University. In 2016, he became a Fox News political contributor.

Personal life and education 
Born in New Jersey, Elleithee grew up in Tucson, Arizona to parents who had immigrated a year prior from Egypt. He was a student at Flowing Wells High School before moving to Washington, D.C. to attend Georgetown University, from which he graduated in 1994 with a degree from the School of Foreign Service. He received his master's degree in political management from George Washington University, also in Washington, D.C., in 1996. He is married to Tali Stein. He and his wife have two children.

References

External links

American Muslims
American people of Egyptian descent
Walsh School of Foreign Service alumni
The Graduate School of Political Management alumni
1972 births
Living people